Upper Sind Frontier District was a district of the Bombay Presidency during British Rule in colonial India. It was bounded on the north and west by the Dera Ghazi Khan District of the Punjab and by Baluchistan ; on the south by Sukkur District; and on the east by the river Indus.

It was formerly known as Upper Sindh Frontier district, being the northern most area of the Sindh province with the Frontier Crimes Regulations as the law of the land. The Frontier Crimes Regulations were repealed in the year 1952 where-after it was named as Jacobabad district. Nasirabad sub-division of Sibi agency was added to the Jacobabad district on 1st May, 1961, which as present no more in the district.

Terrain
The district was described by the Imperial Gazetteer of India as follows:
The District consists of a narrow strip of level plain covered in parts with dense jungle, which, prior to the construction of the Kashmor embankment in 1879-80, was exposed to annual
inundations. The embankment now keeps out the physical aspects. flood-water, and cultivation is general.
north to south . The south-east extremity of the District consists of high mountains, part of the Kirthar range, the highest peak being Miangun (5,100 ft). These hills and the adjacent flood-swept plain are sparsely inhabited. The northern border of the District is skirted by the Bugti hills, part of the Sulaiman Mountains. Geologically, the District consists of alluvial deposits and desert.

Climate
The climate is remarkable for its intense heat, the greatest in colonial India, its variations in temperature, and the smallness of the rainfall. The hot season extends from April to October. For the remainder of the year the weather is cold and agreeable. In November and March the temperature rises considerably in the daytime, but in the winter nights cold is severe and frost. is frequent. Cool nights are experienced
in April and May, after which the full force of the heat is felt, the nights being oppressive and the humidity generally over 70 per cent.

After August the nights become cooler, the north-west wind sets in, and by the middle of October the temperature falls considerably. The annual rainfall averages about 3 inches.

Demography
The District contained one town, Jacobabad and 390 villages, according to the 1872 census it has a population of 115,050, in 1881 145,180., in 1891 174,548 - according to the 1901 census the population was 232,045 (89 persons per square mile). According to the 1901 census, the chief language was Sindi, which was spoken by 165,110 persons, or 71 per cent of the total. Baluchi and Siraiki were also spoken in all parts of the District. Muslims formed 90 per cent of the total population and Hindus 9 per cent.

Administration
The district, headquartered at the city of Jacobabad, was subdivided into 5 talukas:

 Jacobabad Taluka
 Thul
 Kandhkot
 Kashmor
 Shahdadkot

References

Further reading

Jacobabad District
Historical Indian regions

History of Sindh

Geography of Sindh